Cindi Duchow (born August 21, 1959) is an American retail manager, buyer and politician, currently serving in the Wisconsin State Assembly.

Born in Waukesha, Wisconsin, Duchow received her bachelor's degree from University of Wisconsin–Madison in marketing. She has worked as a manager or buyer for several retail merchants, as well as in her family's boat business.

She serves on the Delafield Town Board and is a Republican. In September 2015, Duchow was elected to the State Assembly in a special election.

In November 2020, Duchow was elected by her colleagues to serve as the Majority Caucus Vice-Chair.

References

Living people
People from Delafield, Wisconsin
Wisconsin School of Business alumni
Wisconsin city council members
Women state legislators in Wisconsin
Republican Party members of the Wisconsin State Assembly
Women city councillors in Wisconsin
21st-century American politicians
21st-century American women politicians
American politicians of Polish descent
1959 births